Ornella Bankole (born 17 September 1997) is a French basketball player for Basket Lattes and the French national team.

She represented France at the FIBA Women's EuroBasket 2019.

References

External links

1997 births
Living people
Shooting guards
French women's basketball players
Sportspeople from Auxerre
Black French sportspeople